FNC may refer to:

Entertainment 
 Festival du nouveau cinéma, a Canadian film festival
 Fight Night Champion, a video game
 Fnatic, a European professional esports organization
 FNC Entertainment, a South Korean record label

Television 
 Florida's News Channel, a defunct American television channel
 Fox News Channel, an American television channel

Other uses 
 Farncombe railway station, in England
 Federal National Council (United Arab Emirates)
 Federal Networking Council, in the United States
 Fédération Nationale Catholique, a defunct French anti-secular movement
 FN FNC, a Belgian assault rifle
 FNC Inc., an American mortgage technology company
 First Niagara Center, in New York, United States
 Forum non conveniens
 Cristiano Ronaldo International Airport, in Madeira, Portugal
 National Front of Catalonia
 Front Nacional de Catalunya (2013), a political party in Catalonia